Christina Carreira (born April 3, 2000) is a Canadian-born ice dancer who competes for the United States. With her skating partner, Anthony Ponomarenko, she is the 2022 Four Continents bronze medalist, the 2018 Rostelecom Cup bronze medalist, a six-time medalist on the ISU Challenger Series, and a two-time U.S. national medalist.

They are also two-time World Junior medalists (silver in 2018, bronze in 2017), the 2017 JGP Final silver medalists, and the 2018 U.S. national junior champions.

Personal life 
Carreira was born on April 3, 2000, in Montreal, Quebec, Canada. French is her first language. In spring 2013, she moved to Novi, Michigan, United States.

In May 2018, Carreira filed a petition to be deemed an "alien with extraordinary ability", which would allow her to apply for permanent residency. The petition was denied in August, the decision asserting that her awards "were not directly awarded to you. They were awarded for your performance as part of a sports team…[W]e do not consider such honors to be a nationally or internationally recognized prize or award for excellence in the field of endeavor because it is limited to members of that association and participants of those competitions." She filed a lawsuit in October, describing the conclusions as "entirely irrational". Carreira dropped the lawsuit in early 2019.

Carreira received her American green card in August 2020.

Career

Early years 
Carreira began learning to skate in 2003. Her first coach was Yvan Desjardins. She competed with Simon-Pierre Malette-Paquette from 2006 until 2013. The duo won sectional titles from the juvenile level through novice. Representing Quebec, they became the 2012 national champions at the pre-novice level. They placed fifth in the novice ranks at the 2013 Canadian Championships.

2014–2015 season 
In April 2014, Carreira teamed up with American ice dancer Anthony Ponomarenko. The two decided to represent the United States. It was Ponomarenko's mother, Marina Klimova, who thought the team would eventually be a good match after seeing Carreira in Lake Placid, NY. Their Junior Grand Prix (JGP) debut came in September 2014; they placed 5th in Ostrava, Czech Republic, and then 4th in Tallinn, Estonia. They finished 5th in the junior event at the 2015 U.S. Championships.

2015–2016 season 
Competing in the 2015 JGP series, Carreira/Ponomarenko placed fourth in Riga, Latvia, and then won the silver medal in Toruń, Poland. They received the pewter medal for fourth place at the 2016 U.S. Championships.

2016–2017 season: First Junior World medal 
Carreira/Ponomarenko won silver medals at both of their JGP events and finished fourth at the JGP Final, held in December in Marseille, France. In January, they took the silver medal at the 2017 U.S. Championships, having placed third in the short and second in the free. Ranked 6th in the short and third in the free, they won the bronze medal at the 2017 World Junior Championships, which took place in March in Taipei, Taiwan.

2017–2018 season: Junior World Silver 
Winning gold at both of their JGP assignments, in addition to the Lake Placid Ice Dance International, Carreira/Ponomarenko capped off 2017 with a second-place finish at the JGP Final, held in December in Nagoya, Japan. The following month they became the new US junior champions at the 2018 U.S. Figure Skating Championships. In March, they won silver at the 2018 World Junior Championships.

2018–2019 season: First Grand Prix medal 
Pasquale Camerlengo joined their coaching team ahead of the 2018–2019 season. Making their senior international debut, Carreira/Ponomarenko achieved silver at the 2018 CS U.S. Classic in Salt Lake City, having finished second to Madison Hubbell / Zachary Donohue.  They won the bronze medal at the 2018 CS Nebelhorn Trophy.  For their Grand Prix debut, Carreira/Ponomarenko finished fifth at the 2018 Grand Prix of Helsinki.  At their second assignment, they won the bronze medal at the 2018 Rostelecom Cup.  Following the conclusion of the Grand Prix, they won the gold medal at the 2018 CS Tallinn Trophy.

Carreira/Ponomarenko concluded their season at the 2019 U.S. Championships, where they placed fifth.

2019–2020 season 
Beginning on the Challenger series, Carreira/Ponomarenko won silver for the second consecutive U.S. Classic and a second bronze medal at Nebelhorn Trophy. They won gold at their final Challenger event in November, the Asian Open Trophy, having finished first in both segments.

At their first Grand Prix, the 2019 Skate America, they placed sixth in the rhythm dance after errors on their twizzles. Carreira remarked it was "probably the worst time we have ever performed" the program.  They remained in sixth place after the free dance, which Ponomarenko called "redeeming."  At their second GP event, the 2019 NHK Trophy, they finished fifth in the rhythm dance, but a lift error in the free dance placed them in seventh in the free and sixth overall.

Carreira/Ponomarenko placed fourth in the rhythm dance at the 2020 U.S. Championships.  Fourth in the free dance as well, they would have placed third in that segment but for the invalidation of their choreographic character step sequence due to a violation of the distance requirement.  Taking the pewter medal, they stood on the senior national podium for the first time in their careers.

2020–2021 season: Coaching move 
Carreira broke her foot during the spring quarantine period in response to the COVID-19 pandemic, though she had recovered by the time the rink reopened in the summer.  With the pandemic affecting international travel, Carreira/Ponomarenko were assigned to compete at the 2020 Skate America, attended mainly by dance teams training in the United States.  They won the bronze medal.

On January 10, it was announced that they had withdrawn from the 2021 U.S. Championships. Carreira confirmed it was a positive COVID test of a rinkmate that caused their withdrawal.

On January 27, Carreira announced on Instagram that she and Ponomarenko would be departing their longtime coach Igor Shpilband.  Two weeks later, U.S. Figure Skating announced that Carreira and Ponomarenko would be moving to train at the Ice Academy of Montreal's new Ontario campus in London, Ontario, coached by former Olympic champion Scott Moir.

2021–2022 season: Four Continents bronze
Carreira/Ponomarenko began their season at the 2021 CS Lombardia Trophy, where they placed fourth. They were eighth at the 2021 CS Finlandia Trophy.

On the Grand Prix, Carreira/Ponomarenko placed eighth at the 2021 Skate Canada International. They were fourth after the rhythm dance at the 2021 Internationaux de France, but dropped to fifth overall with a seventh-place free dance after an extended lift deduction.

At the 2022 U.S. Championships, Carreira/Ponomarenko were fifth in the rhythm dance but fell to seventh place after the free dance. They were named to the team for the Four Continents Championships in Tallinn later in January. Third in both segments, they won the bronze medal in their first appearance at a senior championship event. Carreira said they were "happy we're able to end our season with our best free dance, I think. So yes, we're overall really happy, and we want to continue growing into the next quad."

2022–2023 season 
Following the conclusion of the 2021–22 season, Ponomarenko required ankle surgery, which delayed their preparations for the coming season. He revealed that he had been suffering ongoing ankle pain since "severely" spraining it in 2015 and developing joint damage. After years of skating through the pain, it had reached the point where "every opinion I heard was: 'Get the surgery.' Since the Olympic quad was over, this was the time to get the surgery done to make sure I'm fully ready for the next four years." While Ponomarenko spent three months recuperating in Colorado Springs, Carreira continued training by herself in London. When they resumed working together in May, retired ice dancers Madison Hubbell and Adrián Díaz joined their coaching team.

Foregoing the Challenger series to start the season, Carreira and Ponomarenko made their season debut on the Grand Prix at the 2022 MK John Wilson Trophy in Sheffield. They placed fourth in both segments and fourth overall, 11.53 points back of Canadian bronze medalists Lajoie/Lagha, their former junior rivals. At the 2022 Grand Prix of Espoo, Carreira/Ponomarenko were third in the rhythm dance, 1.14 points clear of home team Turkkila/Versluis, and described themselves as "really happy with the performances." In the free dance, they slipped to fourth in that segment and fourth overall, being overtaken by the Finns for the bronze medal.

Following the Grand Prix, Carreira/Ponomarenko made a belated Challenger appearance, winning gold at the 2022 CS Golden Spin of Zagreb. With presumptive national silver medalists Hawayek/Baker sitting out the 2023 U.S. Championships for health reasons, the national podium was more open than would otherwise have been the case. Considered likely bronze medalists going in, Carreira/Ponomarenko unexpectedly placed fourth in the rhythm dance due to a twizzle error. In the free dance they overtook new team Zingas/Kolesnik for the bronze medal.

As national bronze medalists, they were named to the 2023 Four Continents Championship team, and also as first alternates for the 2023 World Championships, the third berth there having been given to Hawayek/Baker. They placed fourth in the rhythm dance at Four Continents, 2.07 points back of third-place Lajoie/Lagha. Fifth in the free dance, they remained in fourth place, beating domestic rivals Green/Parsons.

On February 24, it was announced that Hawayek/Baker had withdrawn from the World Championships due to continued health problems. As first alternates, Carreira/Ponomarenko were called up to make their Worlds debut.

Programs 
(with Ponomarenko)

Competitive highlights 
GP: Grand Prix; CS: Challenger Series; JGP: Junior Grand Prix

With Ponomarenko

With Malette-Paquette

Detailed results
(with Ponomarenko)

Seniors
Small medals for short and free programs awarded only at ISU Championships. At team events, medals are awarded for team results only.  Current ISU personal bests highlighted in bold.

References

External links 
 
 

2000 births
Canadian expatriate sportspeople in the United States
Canadian female ice dancers
Figure skaters from Montreal
Living people
People from Novi, Michigan
World Junior Figure Skating Championships medalists
Four Continents Figure Skating Championships medalists